The Democracy Index is an index compiled by the Economist Intelligence Unit (EIU), the research division of the Economist Group, a UK-based private company which publishes the weekly newspaper The Economist. Akin to a Human Development Index but centrally concerned with political institutions and freedoms, the index attempts to measure the state of democracy in 167 countries and territories, of which 166 are sovereign states and 164 are UN member states.

The index is based on 60 indicators grouped in five categories, measuring pluralism, civil liberties and political culture. In addition to a numeric score and a ranking, the index categorizes each country into one of four regime types: full democracies, flawed democracies, hybrid regimes, and authoritarian regimes. The first Democracy Index report was published in 2006. Reports were published every two years until 2010 and annually thereafter.

Methodology

As described in the report, the Democracy Index produces a  weighted average based on the answers to 60 questions, each one with either two or three permitted answers. Most answers are experts' assessments. Some answers are provided by public-opinion surveys from the respective countries. In the case of countries for which survey results are missing, survey results for similar countries and expert assessments are used in order to fill in gaps.

The questions are grouped into five categories:
 electoral process and pluralism
 civil liberties
 functioning of government
  political participation
 political culture

Each answer is converted to a score, either 0 or 1, or for the three-answer questions, 0, 0.5 or 1. With the exceptions mentioned below, within each category, the scores are added, multiplied by ten, and divided by the total number of questions within the category. There are a few modifying dependencies, which are explained much more precisely than the main rule procedures. In a few cases, an answer yielding zero for one question voids another question; e.g. if the elections for the national legislature and head of government are not considered free (question 1), then the next question, "Are elections... fair?", is not considered, but automatically scored zero. Likewise, there are a few questions considered so important that a low score on them yields a penalty on the total score sum for their respective categories, namely:

 "Whether national elections are free and fair";
 "The security of voters";
 "The influence of foreign powers on government";
 "The capability of the civil servants to implement policies".

The five category indices, which are listed in the report, are then averaged to find the overall score for a given country. Finally, the score, rounded to two decimals, decides the regime-type classification of the country.

The report discusses other indices of democracy, as defined, e.g. by Freedom House, and argues for some of the choices made by the team from the Economist Intelligence Unit. In this comparison, a higher emphasis is placed on the public opinion and attitudes, as measured by  surveys, but on the other hand, economic living-standards are not weighted as one criterion of democracy (as seemingly some other investigators have done).

The report is widely cited in the international press as well as in peer-reviewed academic journals.

Definitions 
Full democracies are nations where civil liberties and fundamental political freedoms are not only respected but also reinforced by a political culture conducive to the thriving of democratic principles. These nations have a valid system of governmental checks and balances, an independent judiciary whose decisions are enforced, governments that function adequately, and diverse and independent media. These nations have only limited problems in democratic functioning.

Flawed democracies are nations where elections are fair and free and basic civil liberties are honoured but may have issues (e.g. media freedom infringement and minor suppression of political opposition and critics). These nations can have significant faults in other democratic aspects, including underdeveloped political culture, low levels of participation in politics, and issues in the functioning of governance.

Hybrid regimes are nations with regular electoral frauds, preventing them from being fair and free democracies. These nations commonly have governments that apply pressure on political opposition, non-independent judiciaries, widespread corruption, harassment and pressure placed on the media, anaemic rule of law, and more pronounced faults than flawed democracies in the realms of underdeveloped political culture, low levels of participation in politics, and issues in the functioning of governance.

Authoritarian regimes are nations where political pluralism is nonexistent or severely limited. These nations are often absolute monarchies or dictatorships, may have some conventional institutions of democracy but with meagre significance, infringements and abuses of civil liberties are commonplace, elections (if they take place) are not fair or free (including sham elections), the media is often state-owned or controlled by groups associated with the ruling regime, the judiciary is not independent, and censorship and suppression of governmental criticism are commonplace.

By regime type 
The following table indicates the number of nations and the percentage of World population for each type of regime. Some microstates are not considered in the calculation.

List by region 
The following table lists the average of each country scored by geographic region. 

The following table lists the number of countries in each of the four democracy classifications.

List by country 
The following table shows each nation's score over the years. The regions are assigned by the Economist Intelligence Unit, and may differ from conventional classifications (for example, Turkey is grouped in Western Europe).
 North America
 Western Europe
 Central and Eastern Europe
 Latin America and the Caribbean
 Asia and Australasia
 Middle East and North Africa
 Sub-Saharan Africa

Components 
The following table shows the five parameters that made up the score of each nation in 2022 and the changes that had occurred since 2021.

 Full democracies
 Flawed democracies
 Hybrid regimes
 Authoritarian regimes

Recent changes 
In 2016, the United States was downgraded from a full democracy to a flawed democracy; its score, which had been declining for some years, crossed the threshold from 8.05 in 2015 to 7.98 in 2016. The report stated that this was caused by myriad factors dating back to at least the late 1960s which have eroded Americans' trust in governmental institutions.

The 2017 Democracy Index registered, at the time, the worst year for global democracy since 2010–11. Asia was the region with the largest decline since 2016. Venezuela was downgraded from a hybrid regime to an authoritarian regime. In China, Xi Jinping, General Secretary of the Chinese Communist Party (CCP), further entrenched his power by writing his contribution to the CCP's ideology, dubbed Xi Jinping Thought, into the party's constitution. Moldova was downgraded from a flawed democracy to a hybrid regime as a result of problematic elections. By contrast, Armenia was re-upgraded from an authoritarian regime to a hybrid regime as a result of constitutional changes that shifted power from the presidency to parliament. In 2017, the Gambia was upgraded again from an authoritarian regime to a hybrid regime after Yahya Jammeh, who was president from 1996 to 2017, was defeated by Adama Barrow, an opposition candidate in the 2016 presidential elections.

In 2019, France, Portugal and Chile were upgraded from flawed democracies to full democracies. In fact, this was not a new experience for the former two, which suffered from the eurozone crisis many years before. By contrast, Malta was downgraded from a full democracy to a flawed democracy. Thailand and Albania were upgraded from hybrid regimes to flawed democracies. Algeria was upgraded again from an authoritarian regime to a hybrid regime.

In 2020, Taiwan was upgraded from flawed democracy to full democracy following reforms in the judiciary, and soared to 11th position from its previous position at 33. Japan and South Korea were also upgraded again to a full democracy, while France and Portugal were once again relegated to flawed democracies. Hong Kong was downgraded from a flawed democracy to a hybrid regime. Algeria was downgraded again from a hybrid regime to an authoritarian regime. The Economist Intelligence Unit noted that democracy "was dealt a major blow in 2020". Almost 70% of countries covered by the Democracy Index recorded a decline in their overall score, as most of them imposed lockdowns and other restrictions in response to the COVID-19 pandemic, in addition to some arresting journalists and citizens accused of spreading COVID-19 misinformation. The global average score fell to its lowest level since the index began in 2006.

In 2021, both the global and regional average scores continued downward trends, with the exception of the Central and Eastern Europe region. Spain and Chile were downgraded from full democracies to flawed democracies, while Ecuador, Mexico, Paraguay, and Tunisia were downgraded from flawed democracies to hybrid regimes. Haiti, Lebanon, and Kyrgyzstan were downgraded from hybrid regimes to authoritarian regimes. In addition, Moldova, Montenegro, and North Macedonia were upgraded from hybrid regimes to flawed democracies, whereas Mauritania was upgraded from authoritarian to hybrid regime. For the first time, two countries displaced North Korea as the lowest-ranked states in the Democracy Index – in Myanmar, the elected government was overthrown in a military coup, and protests were suppressed by the junta, which ultimately resulted in its score going down by 2.02 points; Afghanistan, as a result of the 2021 Taliban offensive and subsequent takeover of government, registered the lowest score of any state ever recorded on the Democracy Index at 0.32.

Criticism 
Investment analyst Peter Tasker has criticised the Democracy Index for lacking transparency and accountability beyond the numbers. To generate the index, the Economist Intelligence Unit has a scoring system in which various experts are asked to answer 60 questions and assign each reply a number, with the weighted average deciding the ranking. However, the final report does not indicate what kinds of experts, nor their number, nor whether the experts are employees of the Economist Intelligence Unit or independent scholars, nor the nationalities of the experts.

See also 
 Corruption Perceptions Index
 V-Dem Democracy indices
 Democracy-Dictatorship Index
 Democracy Ranking
 Freedom in the World
 List of democracy indices
 Democracy promotion
 Gallagher index

References

External links 

 Democracy Index 2022

Democracy
Democracy promotion
Research
International rankings
Economist Intelligence Unit